The 2009 Suriname President's Cup was won by Daniel Adel Houmani who beat Inter Moengotapoe 3-0 in the final.

Match details

Gallery

References

External links
WBC best of the best

2009
President's Cup